Renfrew Airport was the domestic airport serving the city of Glasgow until it was decommissioned in 1966.

It was located in the Newmains area of Renfrew, approximately 2 kilometres east of Abbotsinch Airfield which would eventually replace it. It consisted of a main terminal building and ancillary buildings, and a main runway which ran west south-west of the terminal.

Military use

Already in existence as a military facility during the First World War, it first handled scheduled flights in 1933 with the first regular destination being Campbeltown. During the Second World War it served as RAF Renfrew.

The following units were here at some point:
 No. 6 (Glasgow) Aircraft Acceptance Park (1918) became No. 6 (Renfrew) Aircraft Acceptance Park (1918-20)
 No. 6 (Scottish) Aircraft Repair Depot (1918-?)
 No. 55 Squadron RAF
 No. 80 Squadron RAF
 No. 309 Squadron RAF
 No. 602 Squadron RAF
 No. 666 Squadron RAF
 823 Naval Air Squadron
 1831 Naval Air Squadron

Post war

Despite the construction of a new terminal building (with a parabola arch) in 1954, it became evident that the airport was unable to cope with the increasing demands for domestic air travel in the 1960s. The final departure took place on 2 May 1966 – its destination being the new Glasgow Airport a few hundred metres away.

The site is now occupied by a Tesco supermarket and the M8 motorway; this straight and level section of motorway occupies the site of the runway. Opened in March 1968, the M8 connected the new Glasgow Airport to Bishopton in the west and Glasgow city centre (via Hillington) in the east. The entire airport was demolished in 1978. Arkleston Primary School (1972) and a Tesco superstore (1980) were built on the former terminal site, and the whole of the surrounding area is now covered with housing.

The only trace left of the airport is the Flying Scotsman pub which was the Hertz car rental building, opposite the terminal building.

Services
The airport was served by airlines such as Scottish Airlines, Aer Lingus, Railway Air Services and British European Airways, for destinations in Scotland and London.

Icelandair offered flights to Iceland and a number of destinations in Europe. Other airlines offering international flights were Dan-Air, Sabena and LOT.

Statistics
The airport handled 138,146 passengers in its first year of operations. By the end of the decade, the airport was handling more than half a million passengers annually; one million passengers passed through the airport for the first time in the year 1964. In the year of the airport's closure, it handled 1.4 million passengers.

1 combined with the new Glasgow Airport

In fiction
The airport features briefly in the second novel of a space opera series by Angus MacVicar, Return to the Lost Planet. One of the characters is about to fly back from Scotland to Berlin, but the hero and his companion join him at the last minute on the bus from St. Enoch, Glasgow, to the airport, and persuade him to stay and help them.

References
Notes

Bibliography

 McCloskey, Keith. Glasgow's Airports: Renfrew and Abbotsinch. Stroud, Gloucestershire, UK: The History Press Ltd., 2009. . 
 McCloskey, Keith. From the Blitz to University Flying: Essays on Glasgow's Aviation History. Published on Amazon., 2019. .
 Smith, David J. Action Stations, Volume 7: Military airfields of Scotland, the North-East and Northern Ireland. Cambridge, Cambridgeshire, UK: Patrick Stephens Ltd., 1983 .

External links
 Brief history of Renfrew Airport
 

Defunct airports in Scotland
Airports established in 1933
Buildings and structures in Renfrewshire
1933 establishments in Scotland
1966 disestablishments in Scotland
Renfrew